Susanne Jung (born 17 May 1963) is a retired East German javelin thrower. She represented the club SC Turbine Erfurt.

She won the silver medal at the 1987 Summer Universiade and finished fifth at the 1987 World Championships.

Her personal best throw was 69.60 metres with the old javelin type, achieved in August 1987 in Potsdam. This ranks her ninth among German old-type-javelin throwers, behind Petra Felke (who held the world record), Antje Kempe, Silke Renk, Beate Koch, Karen Forkel, Tanja Damaske, Ruth Fuchs and Ingrid Thyssen.

References

Living people
1963 births
East German female javelin throwers
Universiade medalists in athletics (track and field)
Universiade silver medalists for East Germany
Medalists at the 1987 Summer Universiade